Members of the New South Wales Legislative Assembly who served in the 38th  parliament held their seats from 1956 to 1959. They were elected at the 1956 state election, and at by-elections. The Speaker was Bill Lamb.

See also
Third Cahill ministry
Results of the 1956 New South Wales state election
Candidates of the 1956 New South Wales state election

References

Members of New South Wales parliaments by term
20th-century Australian politicians